is a Japanese football player.

Playing career
Ikeya was born in Kumamoto Prefecture on June 27, 1995. After graduating from Chuo University, he joined J2 League club Roasso Kumamoto in 2018.

References

External links

1995 births
Living people
Chuo University alumni
Association football people from Kumamoto Prefecture
Japanese footballers
J2 League players
Roasso Kumamoto players
J3 League players
Kamatamare Sanuki players
Association football midfielders